Pamarru is a village in Krishna district of the Indian state of Andhra Pradesh. It is located in Pamarru Mandal in Gudivada revenue division.

Transport 
APSRTC operates buses from Pamarru bus station. National Highway 65 and National Highway 165 connects with Pamarru.

See also
Villages in Pamarru mandal

References

Villages in Krishna district
Mandal headquarters in Krishna district